The Empire of Japan competed at the 1920 Summer Olympics in Antwerp, Belgium.

Background
Following Japan's poor showing during its Olympic debut at the 1912 Summer Olympics in Stockholm, Sweden, Japan planned for increased participation and the discipline of its athletes in the 1916 Summer Olympics planned for Berlin, Germany (which was subsequently cancelled by World War I.  Japan also expanded its participation in international sporting events, by competing in the Far Eastern Games held in Manila in 1913, Shanghai in 1915, Tokyo in 1917 and Manila in 1919. By the time of the 1920 Olympics, Japan was able to field a fifteen-man team. Although most of its track-and-field runners and swimmers failed to pass the initial heats, Japan did considerably better in tennis, securing its first Olympic medals. 
However, the Japan Amateur Athletic Association, which sponsored the team, grossly underestimated the costs of journey, and was unable to pay for the team's return from Belgium. Local representatives of the Mitsubishi and Mitsui zaibatsu agreed to pay the $15,000 necessary for the stranded team to come home, but the embarrassment was so great that the Japanese government agreed to provide subsidies for future Olympic participation.

Medalists

|  style="text-align:left; width:72%; vertical-align:top;"|

|  style="text-align:left; width:23%; vertical-align:top;"|

Aquatics

Diving

A single diver represented Japan in 1920. It was the nation's debut in the sport. Masayoshi Uchida was unable to advance past the first round of the plain high diving competition.

 Men

Ranks given are within the semifinal group.

Swimming

Two swimmers, both men, represented Japan in 1920. It was the nation's debut in the sport. Neither of the swimmers advanced to the finals.

Ranks given are within the heat.

 Men

Athletics

11 athletes represented Japan in 1920. It was the nation's second appearance in athletics, having competed in the sport both times Japan had appeared at the Olympics. Japan continued to seek its first medals in the sport unsuccessfully, with a 12th-place finish in the decathlon the best result of the Games for Japanese athletes.

Ranks given are within the heat.

Tennis

Two tennis players, both men, competed for Japan in 1920. It was the nation's debut in the sport. Kumagae took the men's singles silver medal, and the pair also took silver in the men's doubles. The two would have faced each other in the quarterfinals of the singles tournament had Kashio advanced that far, so could not have won any more than the two medals they did win.

References

 
 
International Olympic Committee results database

Nations at the 1920 Summer Olympics
1920
Olympics